Manihinea  is a genus of deep-water sea sponge in the Theonellidae family, first described by Gustavo Pulitzer-Finali in 1993. The generic description was emended in 2002 by Pisera and Lévi..

Species 
The following species are accepted within Manihinea:
Manihinea conferta 
Manihinea lynbeazleyae

References 

Tetractinellida
Animals described in 1993
Sponge genera